Terrence Malick is an American film director, screenwriter and producer. Throughout his career, which has spanned over four decades, he has directed nine feature films and one documentary. He has also written scripts for other directors, and since the 1990s has acted as producer and executive producer on numerous projects.

Filmography

Feature films

As director

As writer

Short films

Acting roles

See also 

 List of awards and nominations received by Terrence Malick
 Thy Kingdom Come

References

Malick, Terence
Malick, Terence